Paul Doran (born 22 November 1939) is a former Australian rules footballer who played with Essendon in the Victorian Football League (VFL). 

Originally from St. Bernard's College, Doran joined Essendon in 1959 and was a fullback in their 1962 premiership side. He retired in 1965 after 82 games for Essendon.

External links

1939 births
Australian rules footballers from Victoria (Australia)
Essendon Football Club players
Essendon Football Club Premiership players
Living people
One-time VFL/AFL Premiership players